The 2022 O'Byrne Cup was a Gaelic football tournament played by eleven county teams of Leinster GAA in January 2022; Kilkenny did not take part. Longford were the holders.

A new rule limits the number of substitutions a team can make; players taken off cannot return, capping the number of changes at 11.

 were the winners.

The opening round game between Meath and Wicklow was called off, with Wicklow infected by COVID-19.

Competition format

The eleven teams are drawn to play in two groups of four teams and one group of three teams.

Each team plays the other teams in their group once. Two points are awarded for a win and one for a draw.

The three group winners advance to the knockout stage, with one of the winners of a four-team group playing the winners of the three-team group in the semi-final, and the other four-team-group winners advancing directly to the final. Drawn games are decided by penalty shoot-out without any extra time being played.

Group stage
Games took place 8–15 January 2022.

Group A

Group B

 Since  and  finished on the same number of points, head to head was used as the tiebreaker.

Group C

Carlow v. Westmeath was not played.

Knockout stage

References

External links
Official site

O'Byrne Cup
O'Byrne Cup
O'Byrne Cup